Johann Georg Ebeling (8 July 1637 – 4 December 1676) was a German composer who was born in Lüneburg and died in Stettin. Ebeling is known as editor and composer of hymns by Paul Gerhardt. He published in 1667 120 songs by Gerhardt, adding new melodies to many, writing the first melody for 26 of them, including "Die güldne Sonne voll Freud und Wonne" and "Du meine Seele singe". Several of his cantatas are extant.

Selected works 
  10 booklets, Frankfurt (Oder) and Berlin 1666/1667.
  Stettin 1670.

Literature 

     
 
 
 Elke Liebig: Johann Georg Ebeling und Paul Gerhardt: Liedkomposition im Konfessionskonflikt. Die Geistlichen Andachten Berlin 1666/67. Lang, Frankfurt am Main 2008, .

References

External links 
 
 
 

17th-century German composers
People from Lüneburg
1637 births

1676 deaths